Sikhs are a religious minority in Denmark. There are estimated to be 4,000 living in Denmark.

History 
The Sikhs started to arrive at Denmark in the late 1960s and early 1970s as labour migrants. In the 1980s and 1990s, Sikh refugees escaping the violent conflicts in Punjab started to arrive in Denmark.

The Sikh community in Denmark achieved official recognition as a religious community from the Ministry of Ecceslesistical affairs in 1985.

Gurdwaras 
The only gurdwara in the country is:
 Gurdwara Sri Guru Singh Sabha, Kirkebjerg Allé 35 A, 2720 Vanlose, Copenhagen.

See also 
 Sikhism by country

References

External links